William Small (9 May 1897 – 16 February 1962) was an Irish hurler. Usually lining out as a full-back, he was a member of the Dublin team that won the 1924 All-Ireland Championship.

After being selected for the Dublin senior team in 1923, Small was a regular member of the team for the subsequent two seasons. He won his only Leinster medal in 1924 before later winning his only All-Ireland medal after Dublin's defeat of Galway in the final. Small won a National Hurling League medal with Tipperary in 1928.

A secondary school teacher at Nenagh CBS, Small died on 16 February 1962.

Honours

Dublin
All-Ireland Senior Hurling Championship (1): 1924
Leinster Senior Hurling Championship (1): 1924

Tipperary
National Hurling League (1): 1927-28

References

1897 births
1962 deaths
Borrisoleigh hurlers
Dublin inter-county hurlers
Tipperary inter-county hurlers
All-Ireland Senior Hurling Championship winners